The Partnership for the Delaware Estuary (PDE) is a regional nonprofit organization established in 1996 to take a leadership role in protecting and enhancing the Delaware Estuary, where fresh water from the Delaware River mixes with salt water from the Atlantic Ocean.  Its mission is to lead science-based and collaborative efforts to improve the tidal Delaware River and Bay, which spans Delaware, New Jersey, and Pennsylvania.

The Partnership for the Delaware Estuary is one of 28 National Estuary Programs throughout the coastal United States working to improve the environmental health of the nation's estuaries. Its staff works with partners in three states to increase awareness, understanding and scientific knowledge about the Delaware Estuary, the region's most important cultural, economic and recreational resource.

The Estuary

The Delaware Estuary is the tidal portion, or the lower half, of the Delaware River Basin. It includes all of the watersheds draining into this portion of the Delaware River and Delaware Bay. The area surrounding the estuary stretches as far west as the Schuylkill River’s headwaters near Pottsville, Pennsylvania, and as far east as the Rancocas Creek’s headwaters near Fort Dix, New Jersey.

Grants & Activities

Institutions award grants to the PDE for various programs and projects that improve the estuary, often in partnership with other organizations. For example:

 In 2004 the U.S. Environmental Protection Agency (EPA) awarded the PDE a $1.15 million Targeted Watershed Initiative Grant for clean-water projects identified by the Philadelphia Water Department to protect the Schuylkill River Valley, a major source of drinking water for the City of Philadelphia.  As a result, the PDE continues to employ a full-time coordinator for the Schuylkill Action Network, a membership organization whose mission is to improve the water resources of Pennsylvania's Schuylkill River Watershed.  
 In 2008 the PDE received a $50,000 grant from the EPA to carry out a two-year study on the effects climate change could have on the estuary.
 In 2014 the William Penn Foundation granted over $630,000 to the PDE.  This supports collaborative efforts to improve two of the region’s most critical sources of water; Pennsylvania’s Schuylkill River and South Jersey’s Kirkwood-Cohansey Aquifer.  Projects that conserve land and reduce farm runoff will help prevent pollution in the Schuylkill River, the Delaware River and Bay’s largest tributary.  Efforts in South Jersey will help to monitor and conserve the region’s dwindling supply of groundwater.

In 2017 the PDE hosted its seventh biennial Delaware Estuary Science & Environmental Summit. This attracted more than 300 scientists, resource managers, and advocates who spent their time "Reflecting on Progress, Charting the Future." This event's purpose is to gather experts from across the region who, otherwise, might never meet, much less collaborate, due to jurisdictional boundaries.

References

External links
 Partnership for the Delaware Estuary
 National Estuary Program
 Facebook Profile
 Flickr Photo Gallery
 YouTube Channel
 Schuylkill Action Network

Environmental organizations based in the United States
Delaware Bay
Delaware River